Société d'Aviation Letord was a French aircraft manufacturing company that was formed in the early 1910s by the French aviation industrialist Émile-Louis Letord. It manufactured a number of military aircraft during the First World War.

History
The company was formed in the early 1910s by the French aviation industrialist Émile-Louis Letord, (1883-1971). It produced a number of twin-engined biplanes for the French military during World War I.

Aircraft designs
Let.1 - reconnaissance biplane
Let.2 - reconnaissance biplane
Let.3 - twin-engined bomber biplane
Let.4 - twin-engined reconnaissance biplane
Let.5 - twin-engined bomber biplane
Let.6 - escort fighter
Let.7 - twin-engined bomber biplane
Let.9 - twin-engined night bomber biplane

See also
 Émile-Louis Letord

References

Bibliography

Defunct aircraft manufacturers of France

Companies based in Île-de-France